The War Merit Cross was a military decoration awarded by the Grand Duchy of Baden.  Established 9 September 1916 by Frederick II, Grand Duke of Baden, the cross was awarded to recognize war service and voluntary work, primarily on the home-front.

Appearance
The Baden War Merit Cross is made of gilded bronze, in the shape of a maltese cross.  A laurel wreath shows between the arms of the cross. In the center of the obverse of the cross is a circular silver medallion.  The medallion depicts the a crowned griffin holding a sword in its right hand and a shield with the arms of Baden in its left.  The reverse of the medallion bears the crowned cipher of Grand Duke Friedrich II.

References

Orders, decorations, and medals of Baden
Awards established in 1916
1916 establishments in Germany